Danny Ellison (born 16 December 1972) is an English former professional rugby league footballer who played as a  for Wigan (Heritage № 879), Workington, Castleford (Heritage № 752) and Halifax.

Playing career
Ellison made his début for Wigan in August 1993 against Hull F.C. After spending a season with Workington, he returned to the first team in 1996, and went on to score a hat trick in Wigan's Premiership final victory against St. Helens. In January 1998, he was sold to Castleford Tigers.

References

External links
 Wigan Career Stats at wigan.rlfans.com
 Statistics at rugbyleagueproject.org

1972 births
Living people
Castleford Tigers players
English rugby league players
Halifax R.L.F.C. players
Rugby league players from Leigh, Greater Manchester
Rugby league wingers
Wigan Warriors players
Workington Town players